Statistics of Latvian First League for the 2007 season.

Overview
It was contested by 16 teams, and FK Vindava Ventspils won the championship.

League standings

Latvian First League seasons
2
Latvia
Latvia